Karana gemmifera is a species of moth of the family Noctuidae. It is found in India and Taiwan.

References

Moths described in 1858
Hadeninae